Pike, New York is the name of two locations in Wyoming County, New York:

Pike (hamlet), New York 
Pike (town), New York